Jean-Marie Messier (born 13 December 1956) is a French businessman who was chairman and chief executive of the multinational media conglomerate Vivendi (formerly Vivendi Universal) until 2002. He is also frequently referred to by the nickname "J2M" and "J6M", based on his initials.

Business career

After studying at the École Polytechnique from 1976 to 1980, and then at the École nationale d'administration between 1980 and 1982, Messier held several posts at the French Economy Ministry, including a post as technical counselor for privatization under Édouard Balladur, during the 1980s, before moving to investment bank Lazard Frères in 1989. He established the boutique bank Messier Partners. After taking up the chairmanship of the utility company Compagnie Générale des Eaux in 1994, he oversaw its diversification into the media sector and its 2000 merger with Canal+ and Seagram (owners of Universal Studios) to form Vivendi Universal.

Forced resignation, and dispute over apartment

Messier was forced to resign from his position with Vivendi in July 2002, after the company posted a non-cash loss of 13.6 billion euro ($US 11.8 billion) during 2001.  During his time as CEO of Vivendi, Messier used corporate funds to buy a $17.5 million apartment for his personal use at 515 Park Avenue at 60th Street in New York City, the swank Arthur Zeckendorf development that was home to Senator Jon Corzine for a time. After he was fired, Messier tried to claim the apartment as part of his severance package, but was rebuffed. However, he did receive 23.4 million dollars in severance from his former employer, Vivendi. Messier then relocated to New York City to work as a business consultant.

Prosecution and conviction

Messier was put on trial in France in 2011 and was found guilty of misappropriation of company funds and divulging misleading information when he headed Vivendi. He appealed the decision, and in 2014 the court overturned Messier's conviction on charges of misleading investors but upheld the conviction on charges of misuse of corporate funds.

References

External links

1956 births
Living people
Businesspeople from Grenoble
École Polytechnique alumni
École nationale d'administration alumni
French expatriates in the United States
NBCUniversal people